Astley is a village and civil parish within the North Warwickshire district of Warwickshire, England.  In the 2001 census it had a population of 219, reducing slightly to 218 at the 2011 census. Astley is Knebly in George Eliot's Mr Gilfil's Love Story. Eliot's parents were married in the church.

St Mary the Virgin
The parish church was rebuilt by Sir Thomas Astley in 1343. An Anglo-Saxon carving of a sundial from an earlier church was preserved in the tower. Thomas Grey was entombed in the church in 1530. The present church dates from another rebuild in 1617 by the Chamberlayne family. It is mainly the chancel of the 1343 building and the original east window incorporated into the tower. Preserved in the church are effigies of the Grey family, eighteen choir stalls painted with images of the prophets and apostles and, on the ceiling, 21 heraldic shields of Midlands families.

Astley Castle

Astley Castle, a Grade II* listed building, is the last of three castles built on the same site and using the same moat. The castle was held by the Newdigate family in the 19th century, latterly being the home of Lieut-Gen. Edward Newdigate Newdegate.  It was later a hotel, and was a ruin following a fire in 1978. The Landmark Trust has transformed the castle into a holiday home, with the addition of a modern style holiday homes within the actual ruins. There is emerging evidence that Hitler may have planned to use Astley Castle if the Nazis had successfully invaded Britain during the Second World War. Astley Castle would have provided him with a fortified structure with appropriate security, supplemented by the protection of a moat. Astley would also have satisfied Hitler's desire for British countryside living with reasonable access to all the major cities.

References

External links

In the news at the Guardian website

Villages in Warwickshire